Zura Barayeva (died 26 October 2002) was the widow of Arbi Barayev, a notorious Chechen warlord. She was killed during the Moscow theater hostage crisis in October 2002, in which she headed a female unit.

A former hostage described her:

"She seemed very normal. She hid her feelings behind a mask of courtesy. She seemed to take pleasure that she was in this situation, that people were listening to her and wanting to talk to her, that she was in control. She would ask people if they had children. She would always say, "Everything will be fine. It will finish peacefully". She took off her bomb belt and carried it over her shoulder, all very relaxed."

References

See also
Shahidka

20th-century births
2002 deaths
Year of birth missing
Russian female criminals
Female suicide bombers
Moscow theater hostage crisis
Women in 21st-century warfare
Russian people of Chechen descent
Chechen people
Women in European warfare 
Women in war in Western Asia

ru:Бараев, Арби Алаутдинович#Зура Бараева